Kateryna Vasylivna Grygorenko (born 30 October 1985) is a Ukrainian cross-country skier who competed between 2004 and 2015.

Career
Competing in two Winter Olympics, she earned her best finish of eighth in the 4 x 5 km relay at Turin in 2006 and earned her best individual finish of 27th in the 30 km event at Vancouver four years later.

Grygorenko's best finish at the FIS Nordic World Ski Championships was 38th in the 30 km event at Sapporo in 2007.

Her best World Cup finish was 40th at a 10 km event in Estonia in 2009.

Grygorenko has one child, a son.

Cross-country skiing results
All results are sourced from the International Ski Federation (FIS).

Olympic Games

World Championships

World Cup

Season standings

References

External links
 

1985 births
Living people
Cross-country skiers at the 2006 Winter Olympics
Cross-country skiers at the 2010 Winter Olympics
Cross-country skiers at the 2014 Winter Olympics
Olympic cross-country skiers of Ukraine
Ukrainian female cross-country skiers
Universiade medalists in cross-country skiing
Universiade gold medalists for Ukraine
Universiade silver medalists for Ukraine
Competitors at the 2011 Winter Universiade
Sportspeople from Kyiv Oblast